Kevin Mambo (born June 29, 1972) is a Zimbabwean-Canadian actor and musician.

He is best known for his role on the CBS Daytime serial Guiding Light in the role of Marcus Williams, which won him two Daytime Emmys and for his role as Fela Anikulapo-Kuti in the Broadway production of the musical Fela!

Early life
Kevin Mambo was born in Harare, Zimbabwe, and raised in Saskatoon, Saskatchewan, Canada. An avid musician, he was in the church choir as a child and started playing piano at age 8, saxophone at age 10, and the guitar at age 19. He attended Aden Bowman Collegiate in Saskatoon and then Brentwood College School in Mill Bay, British Columbia. He studied Political Science and African History at McGill University in Montreal, Quebec where he also took classes at the McGill Jazz Conservatory. Kevin then transferred to the University of Southern California where he earned his Bachelor of Fine Arts degree.

Career
In 2015, Mambo appeared in the Billie Holiday Theatre production of Jackie Alexander's Brothers from the Bottom opposite Wendell Pierce. In 2014, Mambo starred as Barret Rude Jr. in the musical The Fortress of Solitude which premiered at the Dallas Theater Center and at The Public Theater in New York. The musical is based on Jonathan Lethem's, The Fortress of Solitude. Mambo has also appeared in The Book of Mormon as Mafala during the first National Tour (2012-2013) and as Chancellor in Danai Gurira's The Convert (directed by Emily Mann) in 2011–2012. He played Fela Anikulapo-Kuti in the Broadway production of the musical Fela! at the Eugene O'Neill Theatre., and appeared off-Broadway in Lynn Nottage's Pulitzer Prize-winning play, Ruined at the Manhattan Theatre Club and at the Goodman Theatre in Chicago, Hoodoo Love at the Cherry Lane Theatre, Once Around the Sun at the Zipper Factory Theater, and Fela Is a Weapon at the Shrine Theater. Film and television credits include Cadillac Records, Nina, Mistresses; Guiding Light (two-time Daytime Emmy Award for Outstanding Younger Actor in a Drama Series), One Life to Live, Soul Food, Any Day Now, Law & Order, Law & Order: Criminal Intent, Deadline, Law & Order: Trial by Jury, Law & Order: Special Victims Unit, Spin City, Family Matters, Freshman Dorm;´, The Firing Squad, and One of Us Tripped.

Filmography

Film
One of Us Tripped (1997) - Thomas
The Firing Squad (1999) - Kane
Cadillac Records (2008) - Jimmy Rogers
Nina (2016) - Gilles
Rustin (TBA) - Role not announced

Television
Freshman Dorm (1992) - Alex Woods
Guiding Light (1995–1998) - Marcus Williams
One Life to Live (2003–2004) - Jordan Kingsley
Luke Cage (2018) - Sheldon Shaw
Hit & Run (2021) - Detective Newkirk

Videogames
Grand Theft Auto: San Andreas (2004) - Pedestrian
Law & Order: Criminal Intent (2005) - Detective McMillan

References

External links

Kevin Mambo Theatre Credits at Broadway.com
Brian Scott Lipton, "Emmy Winners Kevin Mambo and Darnell Williams to Headline Blackout", Theater Mania, December 18, 2006.
Kevin Mambo the Musician
Broadway World Debut of the Month
Kevin Mambo is Now Sole Title Player in Broadway's Fela!
Conversations with Felicia: Kevin Mambo, Celebrating Fela!
The Convert: Cast Interviews
Kevin Mambo Wears ‘Great Shoes’ and Curses God Nightly in The Book of Mormon Tour
Kevin Mambo, Broadway Actor, Joins Zoe Saldana In Nina Simone Biopic
Free to be You and Me and Jonathan Lethem
Fortress of Solitude and the Un-Suckification of Broadway Musicals
Fortress of Memories
Fortress of Solitude, Adapted from Jonathan Lethem's Book, Opens at the Public Theater
Off-Broadway Review: Fortress of Solitude
The 'Fortress of Solitude' Review: Moving Socio-Pop Musical
Fortress of Solitude Soars at the Public

1972 births
Black Canadian male actors
Canadian male film actors
Canadian male television actors
Canadian male voice actors
Canadian male soap opera actors
Living people
Daytime Emmy Award winners
Daytime Emmy Award for Outstanding Younger Actor in a Drama Series winners
Male actors from Saskatoon
People from Harare
McGill University alumni
USC School of Dramatic Arts alumni